École Tour-Sainte is a Catholic preschool, primary, junior high, and sixth-form college/senior high school in the 14th arrondissement of Marseille of Marseille, France.

 there were about 750 students; circa 2018 there were about 760 students total; 210 students in preschool and primary school, 400 in junior high school, and 150 in sixth-form/senior high school. In 2015 about 75% of the students were Muslim. 42% were classified as low income and were on a bursary.

References

External links
 École Tour-Sainte 

14th arrondissement of Marseille
Catholic secondary schools in France
Schools in Marseille
Lycées in Marseille
Catholic elementary and primary schools in France